Terry Lee Taylor (born July 18, 1961, in Warren, Ohio) is a former professional American football player who was selected by the Seattle Seahawks in the first round of the 1984 NFL Draft.

A 5'10", 188 lbs. cornerback from Southern Illinois University, Taylor played in 12 National Football League (NFL) seasons, from 1984 to 1995, for the Seattle Seahawks, the Detroit Lions, the Cleveland Browns and the Atlanta Falcons. He also coached one season of high school football at Kennedy Catholic High School in Hermitage, Pennsylvania.  He worked under head coach John Turco as the defensive backs and wide receivers coach.

References

1961 births
Living people
American football cornerbacks
Atlanta Falcons players
Cleveland Browns players
Detroit Lions players
Seattle Seahawks players
Southern Illinois Salukis football players
High school football coaches in Pennsylvania
Sportspeople from Warren, Ohio
Coaches of American football from Ohio
Players of American football from Youngstown, Ohio